Estádio 1º de Maio (1st of May stadium) is a state-owned football stadium in Angola's province of Malanje and is the venue for that province's clubs home games in the Segundona and the Girabola. The 3,500-seat stadium was inaugurated on February 2, 2005.

The stadium which underwent major reforms between April 2005 and February 2006, is named after the International Workers' Day.

References

Sports venues in Angola
Buildings and structures in Malanje